Barson is a surname. Notable people with the surname include:

Chad Barson (born 1991), American soccer player 
Frank Barson (1891–1968), English footballer
Jessica Barson, American neuroscientist
Mike Barson (born 1958), British musician

See also
Barnson
Carson (surname)